The Lud River is a river of the Nelson Region of New Zealand's South Island.

See also
List of rivers of New Zealand

References

Rivers of the Nelson Region
Rivers of New Zealand